"Moon Water" is one of dances performed by Cloud Gate Dance Theater Theater in Taiwan.  Choreographed by Lin Hwai-min, it is the second piece of the “Spiritual Journey” series.  This work is inspired by Buddha’s teaching: emptiness like flowers in the mirror or moon in the water.  The premier took place at Taipei National Theater, Taipei, Taiwan on November 18, 1998. Cloud Gate Dance Theater was invited to perform this dance during Sydney Olympic Arts Festival on August 19, 2000.

Choreography and Soundtrack 
The choreography is composed of movements of Tai chi and Ballet. “Moon Water” reveals the lightness such as touching the water surface as well as power of calmness. This dance attempts to present the cycles of life and the beauty of illusion by utilizing water and mirror.  As for the soundtrack, it is the cello solo music by Johann Sebastian Bach during Baroque.

Designers 
Lighting: Chang, ChanTao

Stage: Wang, MengChao

Costume Design: Lin, JingZhu

From 1999, Cloud Gate Dance Theater has toured in England twelve times, in which ten visits were invited by Sadler's Wells Theatre, London.  During this difficult time of COVID-19 pandemic, almost all theaters have been closed.  Sadler’s Wells, presented Streaming video of “Moon Water” from May 15, 2020 to May 22nd 2020 on the Facebook pages of Sadler’s Well and YouTube. The last performance of “Moon Water” was held at its headquarters in Tamshui, Taiwan on November 20, 2016.   Cloud Gate has no plan to revive this piece.

References 

Asian dances
Contemporary dance
Tai chi
Ballet
Performance art